Carol Blackwood (born 27 October 1953) is a British alpine skier. She competed in three events at the 1972 Winter Olympics.

References

1953 births
Living people
British female alpine skiers
Olympic alpine skiers of Great Britain
Alpine skiers at the 1972 Winter Olympics
Place of birth missing (living people)